Michael Keelan (born 1955), is a male former weightlifter who competed for England and the CEO of the Australian Weightlifting Federation.

Australian Weightlifting Federation
Keelan took over from Matthew Curtain as CEO of the Australian Weightlifting Federation on 6 November 2009. He was sacked from the position in 2012 following a controversy but was subsequently cleared of misconduct by the AWF and reinstated to his position.

Weightlifting career
Keelan represented England in the 82.5 kg light-heavyweight division, at the 1978 Commonwealth Games in Edmonton, Alberta, Canada. Four years later he represented England again in the 82.5 kg light-heavyweight division, at the 1982 Commonwealth Games in Brisbane, Queensland, Australia.

References

1955 births
English male weightlifters
Weightlifters at the 1978 Commonwealth Games
Weightlifters at the 1982 Commonwealth Games
Living people
Commonwealth Games competitors for England